The 2014 200 km of Buenos Aires was the seventh edition of this race in the TC2000 season. The race was held in the Autódromo Juan y Óscar Gálvez in Buenos Aires.

Report

The 200 km of Buenos Aires to an exciting career in a final that had a team that was a big winner: Néstor Girolami and Mauro Giallombardo. The pilot of Isla Verde was the first who took off and its strategy was clear: to accelerate as much as possible the Peugeot 408 and, in turn, take care to give to his friend, Mauro Giallombaro. Thus the final took off for this combination that had to be aware of the ravages of his teammates: Agustín Canapino and Rafael Morgenstern.

The guest of arrecifeño was chosen to start the race. And He did more than that until lap 29 ° in which he pitted to return the car to Canapino, endured Mariano Werner (Fiat Petronas) and maintained a reasonable difference, considering it was his first time with the cars more technological country.

After entering and affect change in 32.711 seconds, Canapino hit the track in search of his teammate to overcome and win the competition. With this result and d in sixth position he would leave the Buenos Aires circuit with the points lead.

Meanwhile, Esteban Guerrieri (Toyota Team Argentina) was one of the most entertainment delivered with Ricardo Risatti, mate Leonel Pernía in the Renault LoJack Team because they were looking forward positions in the middle of a squad that dominated to grow Girolami.

Until he decided to pit to give your self Giallombardo. The tension in the pits and the public was overwhelming to know how it would change for the pilot Isla Verde on track because their work was perfect. And it happened. The Peugeot 408 pitted calmly, as if he knew what the end would be. He headed the box led by Ulises Armellini and came. Only took 28.860 seconds to realize it. Yes, it was four seconds faster than Canapino.

Consummate change Giallombardo Peugeot took over and began to recall within this time last edition in 2010 that had played at the Hermanos Galvez when -the triumphed, but as a guest of Toyota and Bernardo Llaver.

All those memories began to appear in the young pilot that was once Bernal Renault race driver. Until he met with a second safety car (the first was on Lap 18) by a car misplaced Nicolas Traut (Ford Focus- Riva Racing). Almost 50 seconds apart with Canapino had vanished quickly.

It was resumed and only had five minutes to spare career with five pilots who was in a position to be the winners: Giallombardo, Canapino, Brazilian Daniel Serra (co- Werner), Pernia and Fontana.

In the first bounce speed, Fontana overcame Pernia and Serra to stay third. Also appearing on stage Facundo Ardusso, who came in a big comeback. When you reach the fork, Ardusso, Canapino and Pernia made a great move by bending the three together. That brought a touch that left Pernia left rubber faulty. At the end of the line, with no control over his car, the driver rammed Tandil Canapino leaving him out of the race and cutting its goal to win and keep the tip of the race.

Giallombardo was heading to victory followed by Fontana and Ardusso. And thus achieved his second win in the 200 km of Buenos Aires and reached the record of being the only driver to repeat the success in this test. He also became the fourth victory in the category Girolami (the last was in Potrero de los Funes 2012) and the first in this competition.

Moreover, Peugeot reached 19 ° victory in the divisional and became the fifth brand imposed 200 kilometers.

Race Results

Buenos Aires 200km
Buenos Aires